Cadalene or cadalin (4-isopropyl-1,6-dimethylnaphthalene) is a polycyclic aromatic hydrocarbon with a chemical formula C15H18 and a cadinane skeleton. It is derived from generic sesquiterpenes, and ubiquitous in essential oils of many higher plants.

Cadalene, together with retene, simonellite and ip-iHMN, is a biomarker of higher plants, which makes it useful for paleobotanic analysis of rock sediments.

The ratio of retene to cadalene in sediments can reveal the ratio of the genus Pinaceae in the biosphere.

References

Petroleum products
Naphthalenes
Sesquiterpenes
Biomarkers
Isopropyl compounds